Bossut is a surname. Notable people with the name include:

 Charles Bossut (1730–1814) French mathematician and confrère of the Encyclopaedists
 Sammy Bossut (born 1985), Belgian football goalkeeper

See also
 Bossuet, surname